The 2006–07 Danish Superliga season was the 17th season of the Danish Superliga league championship, which determined the winners of the Danish football championship. It was governed by the Danish Football Association. It took place from the first match on July 19, 2006 to the final match on May 27, 2007. The ending date was discussed to be postponed to mid-June, if the Danish under-21 national team missed qualification for the UEFA U-21 Championship 2007, as they did, but instead the date was moved from Pentecost Monday to Pentecost Sunday.

The Danish champions qualified for UEFA Champions League 2007–08 qualification. The runners-up qualified for UEFA Cup 2007–08 qualification. The third-place finishers qualified for the UEFA Intertoto Cup 2007. The 11th and 12th placed teams were relegated to the 1st Division. The 1st Division champions and runners-up are promoted to the Superliga.

The fixture schedule can be seen here.

Participants

League standings

Results
To read this table, the home team is listed in the left-hand column.

Top goalscorers

See also
2006-07 in Danish football

References

External links
  SAS Ligaen 2006–07 at the Danish FA
  Netsuperligaen.dk (unofficial site)
  SAS Ligaen 2006–07 at Haslund.info

Danish Superliga seasons
1
Denmark